The Challenge de Madrid was a golf tournament on the Challenge Tour. It was played for the first time in April 2013 at the El Encín Golf Hotel, Alcala de Henares in Madrid, Spain. 

François Calmels won the inaugural tournament.

Winner

References

External links
Coverage on the Challenge Tour's official site

Former Challenge Tour events
Golf tournaments in Spain
Sports competitions in Madrid
Recurring sporting events established in 2013
2013 establishments in the Community of Madrid